= UpDating =

American web series

- Genre: Comedy; Reality; Dating
- Created by: Harrison Forman; Brandon Berman
- Original language: English

UpDating is a live reality show that started in New York City in 2019. UpDating has been virally successful on TikTok, where the account has gained over 1 million followers and received over 45 million likes. The show has received 275 million views across all platforms and tours nationally.

== History ==
The idea for UpDating was conceived by Harrison Forman, a former Facebook employee and blogger, and Brandon Berman, a standup comedian. They both aimed to create a new type of reality show for dating in the age of social media. In 2017, Forman would live stream himself before dates, give halftime reports during dates and then report back to his followers once again after the date was over. Formerly an intern on the Howard Stern show, Berman saw the potential of finding humor in the unexpected. In late 2018, the pair successfully launched the live show, with tickets selling out regularly in addition to garnering viral attention. In 2021, UpDating and its creators signed with the talent agency WME for representation in all areas.

== Production ==
The show pairs two single people for an unfiltered blind date in front of an audience, providing their own half-time reports live on stage. The shows are approximately 90 minutes and are hosted by Berman. During the show, audience members can send a direct message to the UpDatingShow Instagram, use Instagram polls, and ask the daters questions fielded by Forman.

== Reception ==
The live show has amassed waitlists with hundreds of singles and draws crowds of 100+ people. A segment in the Economist stated “Its portrayal of dating, warts and all, is far more accurate. I leave the hotel feeling both soiled and exhilarated. I can't wait to watch it again.”
